The Nova Scotia Senior Baseball League is an amateur baseball league located in Nova Scotia.  The league is the highest level of amateur baseball in the province, it is for players 18 and over.  The league champion traditionally represents Nova Scotia at the following year's Canadian Senior Baseball Championships (the Nationals are in August while league playoffs are in September).  An exception was in 2005 when the league sent an all-star team to the Nationals.

Teams

 The league started interleague play against the New Brunswick Senior Baseball League in 2006.

Former teams
 Bible Hill Blacksox
 Charlottetown (PE)
 Fredericton Schooners (NB)
 Louisdale
 Moncton Mets (NB)
 Morell (PE)
 New Waterford
 Sydney Mines Ramblers
 Liverpool
 Sackville Chiefs
 St. Peter's Royals
 Summerside (PE)
 Yarmouth Gateways
 Truro Bearcats

Notable players
 Richie Walcott, of the Sydney Sooners, played professional hockey for 10 seasons, including in  the American Hockey League and East Coast Hockey League.
Fredericton's Matt Stairs was NSSBL MVP in 1987 and 1988. He was also tied for the league lead in saves, with Dartmouth Moosehead Drys rookie Brian Davidge, in 87.
Bill Lee, former MLB with Boston and  Montreal competed for three seasons. Two with the Moncton Mets (86,87) and one with Sydney (‘89).

League champions

Dartmouth Moosehead Dry 2021

Single season records

 A no hitter was thrown on July 29, 2014 by Halifax's Brandon Mackinnon against the Kentville Wildcats. The previous no hitter thrown in the league was thrown by Halifax's Mark Haverstock vs. the now defunct Sackville Chiefs in 2005.

Neat fact : The 1998 Canadian Senior National Champions Dartmouth Moosehead Dry consisted of 8 starters from a small local baseball association known as Westphal Port Wallis. The players all lived and grew up within one square mile of each other and became Canadian Champions.

External links
 Nova Scotia Senior Baseball League
 Dartmouth Moosehead Dry
 Halifax Pelham Canadians
 Kentville Wildcats

Sport in Nova Scotia
Baseball leagues in Canada
Summer baseball leagues